Dagoberto Ortensi (12 March 1902 – 11 May 1975) was an Italian civil engineer. His work was part of the art competitions at the 1936 Summer Olympics and the 1948 Summer Olympics.

References

1902 births
1975 deaths
20th-century Italian architects
Italian civil engineers
Olympic competitors in art competitions
People from Iesi